Mama Africa is the sixth studio album by Peter Tosh.  It was released in 1983 and peaked at number 59 on the Billboard 200, becoming Tosh's highest-charting album in the US.

Track listing
All tracks composed by Peter Tosh; except where indicated

"Mama Africa" - 7:56
"Glass House" - 5:52
"Not Gonna Give It Up" - 5:48
"Stop That Train" - 4:02
"Johnny B. Goode" (Chuck Berry) - 4:04
"Where You Gonna Run" (Donald Kinsey) - 4:09
"Peace Treaty" - 4:21
"Feel No Way" - 3:31
"Maga Dog" - 4:30

Personnel
Peter Tosh - lead and backing vocals, clavinet
Leebert "Gibby" Morrison, Robbie Shakespeare - bass guitar
Carlton "Santa" Davis, Sly Dunbar - drums
Geoffrey Chung, Lancelot "Maxie" McKenzie - engineer
Darryl Thompson, Donald Kinsey, Ed Edizalde - lead guitar
Mikey Chung, Steve Golding - rhythm guitar
Byron Allred, Peter Couch - keyboards
Robert Lyn - organ (tracks: A1 to A4, B3 to B5)
Skully, Uziah Thompson - percussion
Keith Sterling - piano"
Dean Fraser - saxophone
Ronald "Nambo" Robinson - trombone
Arnold Brackenridge, David Madden, Junior "Chico" Chin - trumpet
Jon Paris - harmonica
Audrey Hall, Betty Wright, Donald Kinsey, Dorett Myers, Pam Hall, Raymond Hall, The Tamlins - backing vocals
Technical
Chris Kimsey, Peter Tosh - mixing
John "Jellybean" Benitez - mixing on "Johnny B. Goode"

Charts

References

Peter Tosh albums
1983 albums
EMI Records albums